Koen Stam (born 27 February 1987) is a Dutch former professional footballer who played as a central defender. He is currently the Head of Methodology at the Feyenoord Academy.

Player career
Stam came through the youth ranks of vv SRC from his hometown Schagen, and was signed to the youth department of AZ. He never came further than the reserve team, and was loaned out to Cambuur Leeuwarden in the 2006–07 season. He made his professional debut in the Eerste Divisie on 1 September 2006, in an away match against VVV-Venlo, coming on as a substitute for Shutlan Axwijk in the 76th minute. The game ended in a 3–2 defeat for Cambuur.

The following season, Stam was loaned out to Eredivisie side SBV Excelsior. Playing only 7 league matches for Excelsior, the loan period was never considered a success. Stam was signed on an amateur-contract by Eerste Divisie side Stormvogels Telstar on 2 September 2008.

Management career
On 8 May 2018, Stam signed a two-year contract at AZ Alkmaar to become the new manager of Jong AZ. On 7 February 2020, Stam announced that he would not be renewing his contract at the club, and on 20 August of the same year Feyenoord announced that Stam had signed a one-year contract to become an assistant manager at the club's under-21 team. On 4 February 2020, Stam became the new assistant manager at Feyenoord's main team as replacement for Željko Petrović.

On 26 May 2021, Feyenoord announced that Stam would leave his role as assistant manager to become the new Head of Methodology at the Feyenoord Academy. As part of his new job he will oversee how players from the Under-13 team through the Under-21 team are trained and developed.

References

External links
ESPNsoccernet profile
VI profile

1987 births
Living people
People from Schagen
Dutch footballers
Eredivisie players
Eerste Divisie players
SC Cambuur players
AZ Alkmaar players
SC Telstar players
FC Volendam players
Association football defenders
Dutch football managers
AZ Alkmaar non-playing staff
Feyenoord non-playing staff
Footballers from North Holland